The Boise State–Fresno State football rivalry is an American college football rivalry between the Broncos of Boise State University and the Bulldogs of California State University, Fresno, both currently members of the Mountain West Conference (MW).

History

The "Milk Can" is the trophy that is awarded to the winner of the game. It was created in 2005, but was not ready in time for the annual match in Fresno, which was won by the Bulldogs after four straight Bronco wins.

The trophy made its first appearance in 2006, when the Broncos carried it off the field. The series dates back to 1977, with three games in different decades, all won by Fresno State. The rivalry effectively began  in 2001, when Boise State joined the Western Athletic Conference (WAC) and upset #8 Fresno State in their first meeting as conference rivals.

Boise State moved to the MW in 2011 and its planned move to the Big East Conference for football for 2013 meant that the future of the series was in doubt. However, after major instability in the Big East, culminating in a mass exodus of seven schools in December 2012, Boise State decided to stay in the MW, ensuring the future of the rivalry. Fresno State left the WAC and joined the MW in 2013, but the two were placed in opposite football divisions and they did not meet in 2015, 2016, 2019, and 2020.

History of the trophy
The idea for a trophy as the prize for the newly arranged interstate rivalry was hatched by two separate dairy groups that decided to get involved with their local football programs. California (No. 1) and Idaho (No. 4) are two of the nation's leading dairy producers.   The South Valley Dairy Group began raising money for Bulldog football in 2001; the Bronco Dairy Boosters began contributing to Boise State in 2005.

Two dairymen and friends in these organizations, Dan Van Grouw of Meridian, Idaho (in the Boise metropolitan area) and Roger Fluegel of Visalia, California (in Fresno State's home of the San Joaquin Valley), put forward the idea of a traveling trophy and began the administrative process. There was positive feedback from the teams, coaches, and fans, but an "administrative changeover" kept the trophy off the field for the 2005 game, though the Bulldogs' 27–7 victory is the first listed on the can.

The trophy only changes hands during regular season contests and has not been on the line when they have met in the Mountain West Championship Game.

Game results

Coaching records

Since first game in 1977

Boise State

Fresno State

 There have been no ties in this series; all Division I games began using overtime in 1996.

See also  
 List of NCAA college football rivalry games

References

External links
 (Article written 24 October 2007)

College football rivalries in the United States
Boise State Broncos football
Fresno State Bulldogs football
Recurring sporting events established in 1977